Universal Japanese Motorcycle (UJM) is a term for Japanese standard motorcycles coined in the 1970s. It referred to motorcycles made by Japanese manufacturers that made motorcycles more accessible to common people. It commonly refers to Japanese motorcycles made for commuting with a four-stroke and inline four-cylinder engine. By around 1990 its popularity began to wane as the market fragmented into more specialized designs.

History 
A defining example of the type, the Honda CB750, was introduced in 1969 with an engine based on technology Honda had developed in Grand Prix racing. Compared to the British and American models that then dominated the market, it had better performance and reliability, was better equipped, and yet was much cheaper. It revolutionized the industry both in America and abroad, and sales in America immediately overtook those of big bikes from established brands like BSA and Triumph.

The CB750's first Japanese competitor was the Kawasaki Z1 in 1972. These manufacturers all produced smaller versions of the same UJM formula, including, for example, the Honda CB500 of 1971. By 1979 Harley-Davidson's big bike sales were down 90%.

The first Japanese vehicle  manufacturing plant in America opened in 1975 to produce the UJM Kawasaki KZ400. Until then the bikes had been imported from Japan.

The term UJM appeared as early as 1976 in a Cycle magazine review of the Kawasaki Z650. The term "universal" arose from the fact that during the 1970s, the Japanese "big four" (Honda, Kawasaki, Suzuki, and Yamaha) all produced very similar designs.

The UJM was a general-purpose road bike, and the style went into decline in late 1980s and early 1990s with the segmentation of the market and the development of niche products, such as sport, dual-sport, touring, sport touring, café racers, and cruisers. Honda sold about 400,000 CB750s, and the model run ended in 2003 with the Nighthawk.

A market revival led by increased demand for simplified standard general purpose, or naked bikes has led Japanese manufacturers to introduce modern interpretations of the UJM, including the Honda CB1100, Suzuki TU250X, Suzuki GD110,  and the Yamaha SR400.

Specification 
The UJM had an advanced design and an excellent specification compared to contemporary European and American competition. The press described it as cheap, reliable, easy to ride, manufactured with precision, and with a reputation for excellence.

Technical specifications typically included a standard riding position, front disc brake, conventional tubular frame and telescopic front forks and twin-shock rear suspension. The engine was typically an inline four cylinder air cooled four-stroke transverse engine, with a carburetor for each cylinder, and single, or double, overhead camshafts. The unit construction engine was mated to a five or six speed manual transmission, and had an electric starter.

References